X-Cops was a side project composed of members from the heavy metal band Gwar and their extended "family" of musicians. Each member of X-Cops performed in a police uniform and had their own character. They released the album You Have The Right To Remain Silent... on Metal Blade Records in 1995. The album included a cover of Deep Purple's "Highway Star" (with different lyrics, to reflect the theme of the album). In addition, they released a 7" single of the songs "Junkie" (featuring the first released vocal performance of Gwar/X-Cops guitarist Michael Derks) and "Beat You Down" on Man's Ruin Records in 1996.

History
Peter Lee started this band after being shot in a failed car jacking attempt. The idea sparked while filming a commercial segment for Gwar's Skulhedface. Lee and Dave Brockie were dressed as police officers and Lee pondered, "What would be cooler than a bunch of cops playing kick-ass rock and roll?" This led to Lee, Brockie and Gwar's drum technician, Mike Dunn, starting X-Cops as a three-piece band. By the time they played their first show, their ranks had grown considerably.

X-Cops opened for Gwar on some dates of their 1994 tour, essentially opening for themselves as every musician in Gwar either played an instrument or sang in X-Cops. They also did a headlining tour in 1995, and some select dates in 1996.

There are two additional songs that X-Cops performed live, but never officially recorded: "Nurture My Pig" (originally a song by The Loco Gringo's
), and "Conflict Management" (sung by Zipper Pig). According to bootleg videos, Casey Orr (Tubb Tucker) played bass for "Conflict Management", taking the bass from Dave Brockie (Cobb Knobbler), who sang back-up.

X-Cops played their final show in 1996 and Orr, Dunn, Lee, and Musel have since left both X-Cops and Gwar. Dave Brockie Experience has since been known to cover X-Cops songs during live shows. X-Cops reunited for one show only at the 4th annual Gwar-B-Q in Richmond, VA, on August 17, 2013.

Band members

Main
 Michael Derks as Lt. Louie Scrapinetti (guitar)
 Mike Dunn as Cadet Billy Club (drums)
 Dave Brockie as Patrolman Cobb Knobbler (bass)
 Pete Lee as Sgt. Al Depantsia (guitar)
 Casey Orr as Sheriff Tubb Tucker (vocals)

Auxiliary
 Brad Roberts as Mountain Bike Officer Biff Buff (vocals)
 Bob Gorman as Sgt. Zypygski aka Zipper Pig (vocals)
 Dave Musel as Detective Phillip McRevis (samples)

References

American hardcore punk groups
Bands with fictional stage personas
Gwar